Luisito Marti (born Luis Bernardo Marte Hernández; 1945–2010) was a Dominican musician, comedian, actor, producer and television host.

Career
He began his artistic career as a conga player in Johnny Ventura's "Combo Show", later becoming a vocalist. In the early 70s, his interpretation of the merengue song "La muerte de Martín" became widely popular in the country. Later, he followed with tracks like "Que pasa Papo", "Te digo ahorita" and "Mamá es la que sabe", among others. In 1976, as a bandleader Martí founded as "El Sonido Original", a group that reached some projection with songs like "Gato entre Macuto", "Jaleo de Acordeón" and "El mudo".

During the 1980s he became part of the legendary comedy television show El show del mediodía, where he soon became a director. Years later he produced his own television show El Show de Luisito and Anthony, with singer-songwriter Anthony Rios, which was broadcast on Channel 9 ColorVision in the early 90s. This show then aired with another proposal called De Remate in the last half the 90s.

Martí also ventured into film in 1995 starring in the film Nueba Yol, characterizing Balbuena, his iconic character. The film, had success at the box office. In 2004 he debuted another comedy show called The Luisito Martí, which aired on Antena Latina, then Telesistema 11 by 2006. In 2007 the Association of Art Critics (ACROARTE) invited him to act as host for the Casandra awards that year by TV presenter Jatnna Tavárez.

Filmography
Que Viva el Merengue y la Lambada (1989)
Nueba Yol: ¡Por Fin Llegó Balbuena! (1995)
Nueba Yol 3: Bajo la Nueva Ley (1997)
De Remate (2001)
Los Locos También Piensan (2005)

Death
In May 2008 he was admitted to the Memorial Sloan Kettering Cancer Center in New York due to stomach cancer. Then in December 2009 he was transferred to the city of Tijuana to undergo stem cell treatment. On 25 December the same year he was admitted to the Diagnostic Center, Advanced Medicine and Telemedicine (CEDIMAT), where he died on January 3, 2010, at 64 years of age.

Legacy
On March 3rd of 2023, bachata singer Romeo Santos released a music video for his song Suegra where he depicts Martí's Balbuena character in a tribute.

References

1945 births
2010 deaths
Dominican Republic comedians
Dominican Republic male film actors
Dominican Republic musicians